Ooma, Inc. is an American publicly traded telecommunications company based in the Silicon Valley, California area. Ooma offers communications services including Voice over IP (VoIP) calling for business, home and mobile users.

History 
Ooma was founded by Andrew Frame, who previously worked for Cisco Systems in 2004. Ooma's initial product was a "VoIP in a box" device that used peer-to-peer VoIP technology to let users make phone calls over other Ooma users' landline services. The system worked through a "hub" connected to the main phone line and "scouts" connected to other phones. In January 2008, Ooma terminated the use of peer-to-peer technology.

PC Magazine awarded Ooma the DigitalLife Best of Show award in the hardware innovator category for the Ooma Hub in 2007. Frame stepped down from his role as CEO in 2009 and was replaced by Eric Stang. That same year, Ooma released its Telo system, which consisted of a base system to access unlimited calling and caller ID. In 2009, Ooma was awarded an Internet Telephony product of the year award for developing the Ooma Telo and the Ooma Telo handset. That same year, Ooma was given the TMC Labs Innovation Award for the Ooma Hub and Ooma Scout. Ooma received the gold consumer product of the year award as part of the Best in Biz Awards in 2011.

In 2011, it was announced that Ooma's VoIP-In-A-Box was expanding to Canada.

Ooma unveiled its HD2 handset in November 2012. The handset includes one-touch voicemail, an intercom, and baby monitoring features. Ooma also launched Ooma Linx in 2012, which used an AC outlet to connect any phone or fax machine to the Telo base station. In December 2012, Ooma received the Internet Telephony Product of the Year award for developing the Telo, HD2 handset, and Linx. Ooma launched the HD3 handset in December 2017 and the Ooma Telo 4G system with wireless internet connectivity in January 2019.

Ooma worked with West Valley City, Utah, in June 2014 to offer free telephone service to households through a fiber network. In 2015, Ooma was named one of the fastest-growing private companies by the San Francisco Business Times and Silicon Valley Business Journal. That same year, it was a gold winner of the Best of Biz Awards.

Ooma acquired security camera startup Butterfleye in December 2017, custom business communications provider Voxter in March 2018, and business communications provider Broadsmart in May 2019. On September 22, 2021, Ooma announced in an email message to its camera users that "We're sorry to inform you that the operation, maintenance and support of Ooma Butterfleye and Smart Cam security cameras will be ending. As such, the last day of operation of your camera(s) will be October 22, 2021. After this day, your camera(s) will stop working and will no longer record videos. Any videos you currently access through the Smart Cam App will become unavailable."

Funding
The company's initial funding round raised $7.8 million in 2005. In 2006, Sean Parker invested in the company. Ooma held a Series B funding round in 2007, which raised $12 million. Investors included Worldview Technology Partners and Draper Fisher Jurvetson. In September 2008, Ooma raised $16 million in its Series C funding round.

Ooma raised a $18.3 million Series D funding round in June 2009. Worldview Technology Partners led the round.

In January 2012, Ooma raised a funding round of $17.3 million from investors, including Draper Fisher Jurvetson and Founder's Fund. The company had raised a total of $83.3 million at that time.

Ooma held its IPO in July 2015. The company went public at $13 per share. Ooma raised $85 million from the 5 million shares offered.

Operations
Ooma's service offerings are broken down into two business models: Ooma Telo for personal or home use and business services, including Ooma Office, Ooma Office Pro, and Ooma Enterprise.

Ooma Telo
Ooma Telo was released on October 1, 2009. Telo is designed to provide unlimited, free VoIP calls within the United States and features Bluetooth integration, HD voice, and a cordless DECT 6.0 handset. Ooma allows customers with an existing landline, cable- or DSL-based VoIP service, or mobile service to port their number to Ooma provided their number is available and able to be ported.

With the premier package, users get Multi-Ring, Do Not Disturb, and enhanced voicemail. Users will also receive Caller ID with Name, which was removed from the basic package following the release of the Ooma Telo. In addition, Ooma Premier offers access to Google Voice extensions for customers with Google Voice accounts (Ooma Telo only).

Ooma Basic customers are charged monthly taxes and regulatory recovery fees (which vary by location), and get unlimited calling within the U.S. and Canada, low-cost international calling, free Ooma-to-Ooma calling, basic voicemail, basic caller ID, call waiting, and E911 service.

Ooma Office
Launched in 2013, Ooma Office consists of a cloud-based phone system including business applications such as conferencing, virtual fax extensions, and extension dialing. In August 2016, the mobile version of Ooma Office was released. The mobile version does not require the base station unit Ooma Office operates through. Features available through the mobile software include a virtual receptionist, call transferring, local and toll-free numbers, conference bridges, and extension dialing. In 2016, the Ooma Office Partner Program was released.

In 2020, Ooma introduced Ooma Connect, a base station, and adapter that provides a wireless internet connection. Connect can serve as backup to provide business continuity during internet outages or as a primary source of internet access in locations where wired internet service is costly or slow. Ooma also introduced Ooma Managed Wi-Fi which brings an enterprise-grade Wi-Fi solution to businesses at a more affordable price point coupled with managed services to facilitate the implementation and ongoing monitoring and management.

Ooma Office Pro 
Launched in 2019, Ooma Office Pro provides all the features of Ooma Office in addition to advanced features, including video meetings, call recording, a desktop app (also known as a softphone), robocall blocking, and voicemail transcription.

Ooma Enterprise 
Launched in 2018, Ooma Enterprise provides a full, customizable unified communications as a service (UCaaS) solution.

References

VoIP companies of the United States
Companies based in Palo Alto, California
VoIP hardware
Companies listed on the New York Stock Exchange
2004 establishments in California
American companies established in 2004
Telecommunications companies established in 2004